Tolu Oloruntoba is a Nigerian-Canadian poet and physician, whose debut poetry collection The Junta of Happenstance won the Governor General's Award for English-language poetry at the 2021 Governor General's Awards and the 2022 Griffin Poetry Prize.

Originally from Ibadan, Nigeria, Oloruntoba currently works in British Columbia as a manager of virtual health projects. His poetry chapbook Manubrium was shortlisted for the 2020 bpNichol Chapbook Award.

References

External links

21st-century Canadian poets
21st-century Canadian male writers
21st-century Nigerian poets
Canadian male poets
Canadian physicians
Nigerian male poets
Nigerian medical doctors
Black Canadian writers
Nigerian emigrants to Canada
People from Ibadan
Living people
Year of birth missing (living people)
Governor General's Award-winning poets